Ákos Hudi (born 10 August 1991) is a Hungarian athlete specialising in the hammer throw. He won several medals in younger age categories including the silver at the 2010 World Junior Championships. In addition, he competed at the 2013 World Championships without qualifying for the final.

His personal best in the event is 76.93 metres set in 2013 in Budapest.

Competition record

References

1991 births
Living people
Hungarian male hammer throwers
World Athletics Championships athletes for Hungary